Airdrie-Cochrane is a provincial electoral district in Alberta, Canada. The district is one of 87 districts mandated to return a single member (MLA) to the Legislative Assembly of Alberta using the first past the post method of voting. It was contested for the first time in the 2019 Alberta election.

Geography
The district is located northwest of Calgary, containing the City of Cochrane, the part of Airdrie west of 8 St SW and south of 1 Ave NW, and the rural area lying between the two communities. It borders Calgary's northern edge between the Bow River and Highway 2.

History

The district was created in 2017 when the Electoral Boundaries Commission recommended abolishing the three districts of Airdrie, Banff-Cochrane and Chestermere-Rocky View, completely reorganizing the ridings surrounding Calgary to reflect the rapid growth in the area, and creating Airdrie-Cochrane from parts of each. In 2017, the Airdrie-Cochrane electoral district had a population of 51,170, which was 9 per cent above the provincial average of 46,803 for a provincial electoral district.

In the 2019 Alberta general election, United Conservative Party candidate Peter Guthrie was elected with 66 per cent of the vote, defeating New Democratic Party candidate Steve Durrell with 25 per cent of the vote, and three other candidates.

Electoral results

References

Alberta provincial electoral districts
Airdrie, Alberta